Ilzene Parish is an administrative unit of Alūksne Municipality, Latvia.

References

Parishes of Latvia
Alūksne Municipality